Sawasdee Bangkok is a 2009 Thai omnibus film directed by nine directors produced by Bangkok Metropolitan Administration (BMA) and Thai PBS. The story about lifestyles of people in Bangkok, it is divided into nine segments.

Summary

Release
The film premiered during the 7th Bangkok International Film Festival (September 24–30, 2009).
The film showed during the 9th Toronto International Film Festival.
The film aired on Thai PBS in mid-2010 on at 08:25pm every Monday night. After the aired, there will be an interview with the production team, the director and the cast.

Notes

References

External links
 
2009 films
Thai drama films
Thai-language films
Films set in Bangkok
Films shot in Bangkok
2000s Thai television series
Thai anthology films
Thai PBS original programming